The Myklebust Ship (Norwegian: Myklebustskipet) is the remains of a burned Viking ship that was found in the burial mound Rundehågjen on the farm Myklebust in Nordfjordeid, Norway. The Myklebust ship is the largest Viking ship that has been discovered in Norway.

Excavation 
The archaeologist Anders Lorange traveled to Nordfjordeid from Bergen in 1874 to investigate the large burial mound locally called “Rundehågjen” or “Lisje Skjoratippen”. The mound stands on the Myklebust farm, a farm which used to house 5 burial mounds, and is believed to have been the home of a Viking Dynasty, lead by among others the Viking King Audbjørn Frøybjørnson of the Firda Kingdom.

The mound was approximately 30 meters in diameter, and almost 4 meters tall. It also had a wide moat around it. The mound contained the remains of a large Viking ship and a number of high-status objects from the end of the ninth century.

Size 
The size of the ship is known on the basis of several finds according to the University of Bergen:

The first is the number of rivets and nails (at least 7000), and the size of these. The size varied according to which part of the ship it had belonged to and the length told how thick the hull of the ship must have been. The second is the large amount of ash in the pile. The ash layer extended to both edges of the mound, and in the middle there were a double layer, separated by a layer of sand. The other layer may have been the burned remains of the ends of the ship, thrown into the middle before the mound was built over the grave. The third is the number of shield bosses in the grave. A total of 44 shield bosses were found, something that is believed to represent the crew of the ship. This number is counted as a minimum number as the grave was only halfway excavated. The shields would probably be placed along the rows on the ship, and therefore gives a picture of the length of the ship. Based on these points, the estimated length of the Myklebust ship is 30 meters (100ft).

Reconstruction 
The Viking museum Sagastad in Nordfjordeid, houses a full-scale replica of the Myklebust ship as its main attraction. The ship was christened by the Norwegian Minister of Culture Trine Skei Grande on the 10 May 2019.

References

Viking ships